Denis Sergeyevich Fedorenko (born 11 June 2003) is a Russian football player. He plays for FC Baltika-BFU Kaliningrad.

Club career
He made his debut in the Russian Football National League for FC Baltika Kaliningrad on 28 October 2020 in a game against FC Dynamo Bryansk. He substituted Mikhail Markin in the 76th minute.

References

External links
 Profile by Russian Football National League
 

2003 births
Living people
Russian footballers
Association football midfielders
FC Baltika Kaliningrad players
PFC Sochi players
Russian First League players
Russian Second League players